Bloom is an Australian streaming television series which was released on Stan. A six-part mystery was released on 1 January 2019, and stars Bryan Brown, Jacki Weaver, Phoebe Tonkin, and Ryan Corr. A second season was released on 9 April 2020.

Premise
A year after a devastating country flood kills five people, a new plant is discovered with the power to restore youth. This is a miracle for locals but some are prepared to kill for it.

Cast
 Bryan Brown as Ray Reed, Gwen's husband and care taker.
 Jacki Weaver as Gwendolyn "Gwen" Reed. Gwen is a retired actor who moved back to her childhood town with her husband, Ray.
 Phoebe Tonkin as Young Gwen
 Ryan Corr as Young Tommy/Sam (season 1)
 Daniel Henshall as Dave "Griffo" Griffiths (season 1)
 John Stanton as Max McKinnon
 Sam Reid as Young Max (season 1)
 Thomas Fisher as Isaac Langlan (season 1)
 Genevieve Morris as Rhonda Stokes
 Anne Charleston as Loris Webb
 Terry Norris as Herb Webb
 Jacob Collins-Levy as Young Herb (season 1)
 Usha Cornish as Farida Korrapati
 Amali Golden as Young Farida (season 1)
 Nikki Shiels as Tina Griffiths (season 1)
 Tessa Rose as Vivian North (season 1)
 Rod Mullinar as Tommy Brydon
 Thomas Ersatz as Shane
 Keith Brockett as Detective Zhen (season 1)
 James Cerche as Detective Wilkins (season 1)
 Peter Carroll as Frank Warlie (season 1)
 Angus McLaren as Young Frank (season 1)
 Ruth Katerelos as Annie
 Jan Di Pietro as CIB Officer
 Maria Mercedes as Margot
 Jackson Heywood as Young Ray (season 2)
 Scott Lee as Skeeter (season 2)
 Jacqueline McKenzie as Anne Carter (season 2)
 Gary Sweet as Old Donnie (season 2)
 Bella Heathcote as Young Loris (season 2)
 Ed Oxenbould as Luke (Season 2)

Episodes

Season 1 (2019)

Season 2 (2020)

Production
Bloom is produced by Playmaker in partnership with Sony Pictures Television and distributed internationally by Sony.

References

External links

 

2019 Australian television series debuts
2020 Australian television series endings
English-language television shows
Television series by Playmaker Media
Stan (service) original programming